Steel is a science fiction shoot 'em up originally designed by Gari Biasillo for the Commodore 64, and later ported to 16-bit machines.

References

1989 video games
Amiga games
Atari ST games
Commodore 64 games
Hewson Consultants games
Video games developed in the United Kingdom
Single-player video games